The  Military Ordinariate of Bosnia and Herzegovina is a Latin Church military ordinariate of the Catholic Church. Immediately exempt to the Holy See, it provides pastoral care to Catholics serving in Armed Forces of Bosnia and Herzegovina and their families.

History

It was created as a military ordinariate by pope Benedict XVI on 1 February 2011 by apostolic bull Magni aestimamus.

Ordinaries

References

External links
 Military Ordinariate of Bosnia and Herzegovina (GCatholic.org) 

Bosnia and Herzegovina, Military Ordinariate of
Bosnia and Herzegovina